This list is of the protected areas or, more properly, Specially Protected Natural Areas (SPNAs) of the Russian Federation that are located in the federal subject of Sakhalin Oblast.

List of SPNAs
As of May 2022, eighty-six SPNAs (Russian: особо охраняемые природные территории (ООПТ)) are listed on the ООПТ России database.

See also

List of national parks of Russia
List of zapovedniks of Russia
Territory of Traditional Natural Resource Use

References

External links
 ООПТ России

Protected areas of Russia
Protected areas of Sakhalin Oblast
Sakhalin Oblast